Yershov is a town and the administrative center of Yershovsky District in Saratov Oblast, Russia, located in the upper streams of the Maly Uzen River,  east of Saratov, the administrative center of the oblast. Population:

History
It was founded as a settlement serving the Yershovo railway station, which was opened in 1894 and named after the engineer who was in charge of building it. Town status was granted to Yershovo in 1963, at which time it was also given its present name.

Geography

Climate

Administrative and municipal status
Within the framework of administrative divisions, Yershov serves as the administrative center of Yershovsky District, to which it is directly subordinated. As a municipal division, the town of Yershov, together with four rural localities, is incorporated within Yershovsky Municipal District as Yershov Urban Settlement.

References

Notes

Sources

External links
Mojgorod.ru. Entry on Yershov 

Cities and towns in Saratov Oblast
Novouzensky Uyezd